The SETCA Milan was a French-built two-seat light utility aircraft of the 1940s manufactured by SETCA (Société d'Études Techniques et de Constructions Aéronautiques).

Design and development 
The Milan was designed by Messrs. Laboureix and Lagrevol as a two-seat side-by-side light utility aircraft.  It was of all-wood construction with a fixed spatted tricycle undercarriage and had dual controls.  Powered by a  Regnier 4E.0 inverted inline engine, it first flew in 1947.

Production and service
The Milan obtained its CNRA in August 1949. Its normal  was awarded in 1952. The prototype F-BCZZ was flown until at least 1957, but plans for further production did not reach fruition.

Specifications

References

1940s French civil utility aircraft
Low-wing aircraft
Single-engined tractor aircraft
Aircraft first flown in 1947